The Prime Minister's Office is a state body within the Government of Kazakhstan, which coordinates the activities of state bodies, control functions and other functions stipulated by law and the relevant Regulation, as well as an authorized state body to protect state secrets and ensure information security.

History 
First, the structure was named Administrative Department of the Council of People's Commissars of the Council of Ministers, then:

Joint President's Office (1990–1991)
Office of the President and Cabinet of Ministers (1991–1994)
Department of Cabinet of Ministers (1995)
Department of Government (1995–1997)
Prime Minister's Office (1997)

Structure 
For 2020:

 Secretariat of Prime Minister of the Republic of Kazakhstan
Center of Project Management
Department of Human Resources
Press Service Prime Minister of Kazakhstan
Summary and Analysis department
Government representation in the parliament of Kazakhstan
Law department
Department of Regional Development
Economical department
Department of Industrial Innovation Development
Department of Social and Cultural Development
Department of Foreign Economic Cooperation 
Department of Defense and Law Enforcement
Department for the protection of public secrets and special types of connection
Department of Finance and Economy
Department of Control and Document Support

References

Government ministries of Kazakhstan
Norway, Office of the Prime Minister
Kazakhstan
1997 establishments in Norway